"Ruffneck" is a hip hop song recorded by American rapper MC Lyte. It was published on May 27, 1993, as the lead single from her fourth studio album, Ain't No Other (1993). The song was produced by Aqil Davidson (of Wreckx-n-Effect) with Walter "Mucho" Scott, who along with Lyte have songwriting credits.

The song peaked at  35 on the US Billboard Hot 100 in October 1993 and the third  1 single on the Billboard Hot Rap Songs of her career. It also reached  67 on the UK Singles Chart. On November 30, 1993 "Ruffneck" became the first work by a female solo rapper to be certified gold by the RIAA.

With this single Lyte also received her first Grammy Award nomination for Best Rap Solo Performance at the 36th Grammy Awards in February 1994, but lost to Dr. Dre's "Let Me Ride".

In 2011 it was included on XXL's "250 Greatest Hip-Hop Songs of the 90s" list. In April 2013, the song was included  17 on Complex's "The 50 Best Rap Songs by Women" list. "Ruffneck" was listed in the Rock Song Index: The 7500 Most Important Songs for the Rock and Roll Era (2005) by Bruce Pollock.

Conception and composition
The song contains a much more aggressive style than its previous singles. In Ruffneck, which has been described as an "ode to thug love", MC Lyte explicitly talks about her sexual preference for men who have a "wicked smile with a mouth full of gold teeth", "dude with a attitude" who'll "smack it, lick it, swallow it up style."

As Lyte told Vibe magazine in 2011, the song came about after then-Atlantic vice president Sylvia Rhone sent it to Virginia to work with Teddy Riley and his production team, who already had tracks ready for her.

Regarding her use of the expression "ruffneck" she commented "I started talking about having something that gives tribute to West Indians because I grew up around that culture. And ruffneck happened to be a term that was used in West Indian culture. It was the feel that New York was going through." Years later Lyte was asked what happened to the girl who wanted a ruffneck, to which she replied "She’s older now. She still wants a ruffneck, but a ruffneck that’s a little more into the same things I’m into. Back then, I was still finding my way and was just someone who was willing to grow. So I’m not looking for the same ruffneck that I was looking back for then."

In April 2020, on the 19th anniversary of the passing of TLC's  Left Eye  Lopes, Lyte has confessed that she originally had an appearance in the second verse "She flew down in the middle of her tour to Virginia to hit the studio with Aquil Davidson, Teddy Riley and ME", but that it could not be finalized because it was not approved by her label.

Samples
The song is made up of multiple elements from James Brown's "The Payback". It also has an interpolation to "If It Ain't Rough, It Ain't Right" by Pete Rock & C.L. Smooth.

Music video
The music video for "Ruffneck" was directed by Pamela Birkhead, who also worked with Run-DMC and the progressive metal group Dream Theater, and was released in May 1993. Filmed on Long Island, it shows MC Lyte rapping with a group of men behind them cheering in the chorus and in a rooftop overlooking the Manhattan Bridge. It also features a cameo from former X Clan member Lin Que.

In July 2016, in her note Hip-Hop Music Videos From Women in the ‘90s That Still Give Us Life, VH1's Jasmine Grant commented:

Appearances
"Ruffneck" was included in his compilation albums The Very Best of MC Lyte (2001), Rhyme Masters (2005), Rhino Hi-Five: MC Lyte (2007), Cold Rock a Party - Best Of MC Lyte (2019)  and on the EastWest Maxi-Single "Lyte Of A Decade" (1996).
MC Lyte performed this song in his tribute at the 2006 VH1 Hip Hop Honors.
In October 2008 she performed "Ruffneck" at the BET Hip Hop Awards. "Ruffneck" was also featured on Electronic Art's 2005 video game NBA Street V3.

Commercial performance
Although at the time of its publication "Ruffneck" divided its fans, it ended up becoming a crossover success. It became Lyte's second song on the US Billboard Hot 100 after Poor Georgie and her first top 40 single, peaking at #35  in October 1993 and staying a total of 20 weeks on the chart. It also became her first top 10 single on the Billboard's Hot R&B Singles, peaking at #10 in September of the same year, and her third song to reach #1 on the Hot Rap Songs charts. It also peaked at #67 on the UK Singles Chart, marking MC Lyte's first appearance on a chart outside of the United States as a lead artist. On the UK Dance Singles Chart, the song fared even better, reaching #22.

On November 30, 1993 "Ruffneck" became the first work by a female solo rapper to be certified gold by the RIAA, with 500,000 certified units (Previously only groups like Salt-N-Pepa and J. J. Fad had succeeded).

Reception and influence
In his "Consumer Guide" column in The Village Voice, critic Robert Christgau described the song as "magnificent" and that "will break her pop if anything does, and I'm pessimistic enough about America and the 'hood to suspect that it's too good to do the trick." Described the Ruffneck chorus as "male cheering like the studio was a football terrace" and "strangely reminiscent of an oi anthem". Christgau also commented on the lyrics "he's always rude and not always what he pretends to be, but when she's got a problem: "He'll be there / Right by my side with his ruffneck tactics." I hope so. Because they're going to need each other." Amy Linden from Vibe would write about the content of the song "I don't think bitches ain't nuthin 'but hoes and tricks, and all respect due to Lyte, but this girl don't want a ruffneck' cause I just have this gut feeling that a guy who gets his kicks peeing on the street is not the male role model my son needs." During a note with Michel Marriott from New York Times, the playwright and screenwriter Richard Wesley reflected on the song that "the celebration of the ruffneck" represents "a paradox of identity, attitude and mannerisms of generations-long in black America." The Washington Times's Geoffrey Himes highlighted his "catchy Naughty by Nature-like cheerleader chorus."

In retrospect, AllMusic's Alex Henderson commented in his Ain't No Other album review that Ruffneck is "The song that did the most to define the album", describing it as a "catchy, inspired single". 
In 2001 Mark Anthony Neal of PopMatters opined that with the release of the single Lyte "introduces a moment in hip-hop where female acts like Salt-N-Pepa would reinscribe the value of "authentic" black masculinity/sexuality on tracks like Whatta Man and Shoop." In 2013 Complex's Lauren Nostro reviewed the song, which she deemed gave Lyte "her commercial peak five years after her Hall of Fame career", describing her beat as "syncopated head-nodding". and saying that his chorus is "ridiculously catchy". In September 2020, Vulture's Dee Lockett commented that with this song Lyte "set the standard for what women were "allowed" to rap about, and generations of New York rappers as Nicki Minaj, Cardi B, Foxy Brown and Lil' Kim followed her lead."

Accolades

Single track listing

A-Side
"Ruffneck" (12" Mix)- 5:22 
"Ruffneck" (Dub Mix)- 5:25 
"Ruffneck" (Instrumental)- 3:52

B-Side
"Brooklyn" (Radio Edit)- 4:05 
"Brooklyn" (Dub Mix)- 4:05 
"Brooklyn" (Instrumental)- 3:51

Personnel
Credits are taken from the liner notes.
Lyrics By – Lyte
Producer, Lyrics By, Music By – Aqil Davidson (tracks: A1 to A3)
Producer, Music By – Franklyn Grant (tracks: B1 to B3), Markel Riley, Tyrone Fyffe (tracks: B1 to B3), Walter "Mucho" Scott (tracks: A1 to A3)
Engineer – Franklin Grant, Keston Wright
Executive Producer – Nat Robinson

Charts and certifications

Weekly charts

Year-end charts

Certifications

See also
 List of Billboard number-one rap singles of the 1980s and 1990s

References

 

MC Lyte songs
Atlantic Records singles
1993 songs
1993 singles
Songs written by MC Lyte